Lynne Elizabeth Maquat is an American biochemist and molecular biologist whose research focuses on the cellular mechanisms of human disease. She is an elected member of the American Academy of Arts and Sciences, the National Academy of Sciences and the National Academy of Medicine. She currently holds the J. Lowell Orbison Endowed Chair and is a professor of biochemistry and biophysics, pediatrics and of oncology at the University of Rochester Medical Center. Professor Maquat is also Founding Director of the Center for RNA Biology and Founding Chair of Graduate Women in Science at the University of Rochester.

Education
Maquat graduated magna cum laude with a Bachelor of Science degree in biology from the University of Connecticut; her thesis was in cell biology.  She received her PhD in biochemistry from the University of Wisconsin.

Career and research
Maquat did postdoctoral research at the McArdle Laboratory for Cancer Research. She has published more than 130 papers in peer-reviewed journals and edited numerous books.

Lynne Elizabeth Maquat is the J. Lowell Orbison Endowed Chair, Professor of Biochemistry & Biophysics who holds concomitant appointments in pediatrics and in oncology, Founding Director of the Center for RNA Biology, and Founding Chair of Graduate Women in Science at the University of Rochester in Rochester, New York. After obtaining her PhD in biochemistry from the University of Wisconsin-Madison and undertaking post-doctoral work at the McArdle Laboratory for Cancer Research, she joined Roswell Park Comprehensive Cancer Center before moving to the University of Rochester. Maquat's research focuses on the molecular basis of human diseases, with particular interest in mechanisms of mRNA decay. Maquat discovered nonsense-mediated mRNA decay (NMD) in 1981 and, subsequently, the exon-junction complex (EJC) and how the EJC marks mRNAs for a quality-control “pioneer” round of protein synthesis. She also discovered Staufen-mediated mRNA decay, which mechanistically competes with NMD and, by so doing, new roles for short interspersed elements and long non-coding RNAs. Additionally, she has defined a new mechanism by which microRNAs are degraded, thereby regulating mRNAs so as to promote the cell cycle. Maquat is an elected Fellow of the American Association for the Advancement of Science (2006); an elected Member of the American Academy of Arts & Sciences (2006), the National Academy of Sciences (2011), and the National Academy of Medicine (2018); and a Batsheva de Rothschild Fellow of the Israel Academy of Sciences & Humanities (2012-3). She received the William C. Rose Award from the American Society for Biochemistry & Molecular Biology (2014); a Canada Gairdner International Award (2015); the international RNA Society Lifetime Achievement Award in Service (2010) and in Science (2017); the Vanderbilt Prize in Biomedical Science (2017); the FASEB Excellence in Science Award (2018); the Wiley Prize in Biomedical Sciences from Rockefeller University (2018); the International Union of Biochemistry and Molecular Biology Medal (2019); the Wolf Prize in Medicine from the Wolf Foundation in Israel (2021); and the Warren Alpert Foundation Prize from Harvard Medical School (2021). Maquat is well known for her efforts to promote women in science. In 2003, she founded the University of Rochester Graduate Women in Science program to address the "leaky pipeline" in science, which describes how fewer women than men who earn a Ph.D. degree in science go on to use that degree in a career.

Elected fellowships/memberships
 2006 American Association for the Advancement of Science
 2006 American Academy of Arts and Sciences
 2011 National Academy of Sciences
 2018 National Academy of Medicine

Awards and honors
 2010 Lifetime Achievement Award in Service from the International RNA Society
 2012-2013 Batsheva de Rothschild Fellow of the Israel Academy of Sciences and Humanities
 2014 Athena Award for community involvement   
 2014 William C. Rose Award   
 2015 Canada Gairdner International Award   
 2017 Vanderbilt Prize in Biomedical Science    
 2017 Lifetime Achievement Award in Science from the International RNA Society   
 2018 FASEB Excellence in Science Award.    
 2018 Wiley Prize in Biomedical Sciences, Rockefeller University, New York, NY
 2019 IUBMB Jubilee Lectureship
 2021 Wolf Prize in Medicine, Wolf Foundation, Israel 
 2021 Warren Alpert Foundation Prize Harvard Medical School, Boston, Massachusetts
 2023 Gruber Prize in Genetics Gruber Foundation, Yale University, New Haven, Connecticut

References 

University of Connecticut alumni
University of Wisconsin–Madison College of Letters and Science alumni
University of Rochester faculty
Year of birth missing (living people)
Living people
Members of the National Academy of Medicine